Harold Ian McClure (1905–9 January 1982), known as Ian McClure, was a surgeon and politician in Northern Ireland.

Born in Dundonald, McClure studied at Campbell College, then at Queen's University, Belfast.  He first graduated in medicine, then in pathology, bacteriology and biochemistry.  In 1932, he became a Fellow of the Royal College of Surgeons of Edinburgh, and in 1944, a Fellow of the Royal College of Obstetricians and Gynaecologists.  In 1937, he began lecturing at Queen's.

At the 1962 Northern Ireland general election, McClure was elected for the Ulster Unionist Party in the Queen's University seat.  He held his seat at the 1965 general election, but it was abolished from the 1969 election.  He was instead elected to the Senate of Northern Ireland, and served until it was prorogued in 1972.

References

1905 births
1982 deaths
Academics of Queen's University Belfast
Alumni of Queen's University Belfast
Members of the House of Commons of Northern Ireland 1962–1965
Members of the House of Commons of Northern Ireland 1965–1969
Members of the Senate of Northern Ireland 1969–1973
Surgeons from Northern Ireland
Ulster Unionist Party members of the House of Commons of Northern Ireland
20th-century Irish medical doctors
Members of the House of Commons of Northern Ireland for Queen's University of Belfast
People educated at Campbell College
Fellows of the Royal College of Surgeons of Edinburgh
Ulster Unionist Party members of the Senate of Northern Ireland
People from Dundonald, County Down
20th-century surgeons